Kodiak Island Borough School District (KIBSD) is a school district headquartered in Kodiak, Alaska and serving Kodiak Island.

Schools
Kodiak elementary schools:
 East Elementary School
 Main Elementary School
 North Star Elementary School
 Peterson Elementary School
Kodiak secondary schools:
 Kodiak Middle School
 Kodiak High School

Rural schools (all K-12):
 Akhiok School
 Chiniak School
 Karluk School
 Larsen Bay School (Closed for the 2018–2019 school year.)
 Old Harbor School
 Ouzinkie School
 Port Lions School

Other:
 AKTeach (correspondence school)

References

External links
 

School districts in Alaska
Education in Kodiak Island Borough, Alaska